Chlorostoma lischkei is a species of sea snail, a marine gastropod mollusk in the family Tegulidae.

Description
The size of the shell attains 24 mm. The shell is without longitudinal folds. It is olive-colored with lead-colored apex. The umbilicus is covered.

Distribution
This species occurs in the Northwest Pacific Ocean.

References

 Lee, J.J., 1990. Bioecological study of the northern coastal area in Chenju Island. Korean Journal of Malacology 6(1):33-44
 Williams S.T., Karube S. & Ozawa T. (2008) Molecular systematics of Vetigastropoda: Trochidae, Turbinidae and Trochoidea redefined. Zoologica Scripta 37: 483–506

External links
 

lischkei
Gastropods described in 1874
Marine gastropods